Bilaua is a town and a nagar panchayat in Gwalior district in the state of Madhya Pradesh, India.

Geography
It has an average elevation of 236 metres (774 feet).

Demographics
 India census, Bilaua had a population of 20,000. Males constitute 88% of the population and females 74%. Bilaua has an average literacy rate of 85%, higher than the national average of 59.5%; with male literacy of 66% and female literacy of 42%. 16% of the population is under 6 years of age.

References

Cities and towns in Gwalior district